La Zerda ou les chants de l'oubli (English: The Zerda and the Songs of Forgetting) is a 1979 avant-garde experimental documentary film directed by Assia Djebar.

Synopsis 
Using archival photographs and film footage shot between 1912 and 1942 in the colonial Maghreb, Djebar composes an experimental film essay in which the soundtrack reveals what the images cannot express alone. The film becomes a historical account that gives life to the forgotten ceremonies (such as the Zerda festival) and repressed lifestyles of indigenous Algerians, while simultaneously questioning the influence of their colonial context on the representations they portray.

Production
The film was directed by Assia Djebar, and experimental in style. The film was one of two documentary films directed by Djebar during her decade-long hiatus from writing, in collaboration with poet Malek Alloula and Moroccan composer Ahmed Essyad.

Accolades
The film won the prize for Best Historical Film at the 1983 Berlin International Film Festival.

Existing copy

References

External links 
 

1980s Arabic-language films
1980s French-language films
1980s multilingual films